This is the discography of Marianne Faithfull, an English singer and actress.

Albums

Studio albums

Live albums

Select compilation albums

Singles
{| class="wikitable plainrowheaders" style="text-align:center;"
! rowspan="2" | Title
! rowspan="2" | Year
! colspan="11" | Peak chart positions 
! rowspan="2" | Album (UK versions)
|-
! style="width:3em;font-size:85%" | UK
! style="width:3em;font-size:85%" | AUS
! style="width:3em;font-size:85%" | AUT
! style="width:3em;font-size:85%" | BEL(FL)
! style="width:3em;font-size:85%" | FRA
! style="width:3em;font-size:85%" | GER
! style="width:3em;font-size:85%" | IRE
! style="width:3em;font-size:85%" | NZ
! style="width:3em;font-size:85%" | SWE
! style="width:3em;font-size:85%" | SWI
! style="width:3em;font-size:85%" | US
|-
!scope="row"|"As Tears Go By"b/w "Greensleeves" (Non-album track)
|rowspan="2"|1964
| 9 || 35 || — || — || — || — || 9 || — || — || — || 22
| Marianne Faithfull
|-
!scope="row"|"Blowin' in the Wind"b/w "House of the Rising Sun" (from Come My Way)
| — || — || — || — || — || — || — || — || — || — || —
|Non-album single
|-
!scope="row"|"Come and Stay with Me"b/w "What Have I Done Wrong"
|rowspan="5"|1965
| 4 || 6 || — || — || 43 || — || 6 || — || — || — || 26
| Marianne Faithfull
|-
!scope="row"|"This Little Bird"b/w "Morning Sun" (Non-album track)
| 6 || 11 || — || — || — || — || 4 || 7 || — || — || 32
|rowspan="4"|The World of Marianne Faithfull
|-
!scope="row"|"Summer Nights"b/w "The Sha La La Song" (Non-album track)
| 10 || 18 || — || — || — || — || — || — || — || — || 24
|-
!scope="row"|"Yesterday"b/w "Oh Look Around You" (Non-album track)
| 36 || 79 || — || — || — || — || — || — || — || — || —
|-
!scope="row"|"Go Away from My World"b/w "Oh Look Around You" (Non-album track)
| — || — || — || — || — || — || — || — || — || — || 89
|-
!scope="row"|"Tomorrow's Calling"b/w "That's Right Baby" (Non-album track)
|rowspan="2"|1966
| — || — || — || — || — || — || — || — || — || — || —
|Love in a Mist
|-
!scope="row"|"Counting"b/w "I'd Like to Dial Your Number" (Non-album track)
| — || — || — || — || — || — || — || — || — || — || —
|Non-album single
|-
!scope="row"|"Is This What I Get for Loving You?"b/w "Tomorrow's Calling" 
| 1967
| 43 || 42 || — || — || — || — || — || — || — || — || —
|Love in a Mist
|-
!scope="row"|"Something Better"b/w "Sister Morphine"
| 1969
| — || — || — || — || — || — || — || — || — || — || —
| Non-album single
|-
!scope="row"|"Dreamin' My Dreams"b/w "Lady Madelaine"
| 1975
| — || — || — || — || — || — || 1 || — || — || — || —
|rowspan="3"|Dreamin' My Dreams
|-
!scope="row"|"All I Wanna Do in Life"b/w "Wrong Road Again"
| 1976
| — || — || — || — || — || — || 11 || — || — || — || —
|-
!scope="row"|"The Way You Want Me to Be"b/w "Wrong Road Again"
| 1978
| — || — || — || — || — || — || — || — || — || — || —
|-
!scope="row"|"The Ballad of Lucy Jordan"b/w "Brain Drain"
| 1979
| 48 || 48 || 2 || 7 || 17 || 5 || — || 20 || — || 5 || —
|rowspan="2"|Broken English
|-
!scope="row"|"Broken English"b/w "What's the Hurry"
| 1980
| — || 75 || — || — || 8 || 26 || — || 25 || 12 || — || —{{efn|"Broken English" did not enter the [[Billboard Hot 100|Billboard Hot 100]], but it peaked at number 59 on the Billboard Dance Club Songs chart.}}
|-
!scope="row"|"Intrigue"b/w "For Beautie's Sake"
| 1981
| — || 79 || — || — || — || — || — || — || — || — || —
|rowspan="2"|Dangerous Acquaintances|-
!scope="row"|"Sweetheart"b/w "Over Here" (Non-album track)
|rowspan="2"|1982
| — || 69 || — || 29 || 45 || — || — || — || — || — || —
|-
!scope="row"|"Sister Morphine"b/w "Broken English" (from Broken English)
| — || — || — || — || — || — || — || 37 || — || — || —
| Non-album single
|-
!scope="row"|"Running for Our Lives"b/w "She's Got a Problem"
| 1983
| — || 40 || — || — || 36 || — || — || — || — || — || —
| A Child's Adventure|-
!scope="row"|"Hang It on Your Heart"
| 1997
| — || — || — || — || — || — || — || — || — || — || —
| Non-album single
|-
!scope="row"|"Vagabond Ways"
| 1999
| — || — || — || — || 97 || — || — || — || — || — || —
| Vagabond Ways|-
!scope="row"|"Sex with Strangers"
| 2002
| — || — || — || — || — || — || — || — || — || — || —
| Kissin' Time|-
!scope="row"|"Easy Come, Easy Go" (France only)
| 2008
| — || — || — || — || 89 || — || — || — || — || — || —
| Easy Come, Easy Go|-
!scope="row"|"Why Did We Have to Part?"
| 2011
| — || — || — || — || — || — || — || — || — || — || —
| Horses and High Heels|-
!scope="row"|"Sparrows Will Sing"
| 2014
| — || — || — || — || — || — || — || — || — || — || —
| Give My Love to London|-
!scope="row"|"The Gypsy Faerie Queen"
| 2018
| — || — || — || — || — || — || — || — || — || — || —
| Negative Capability|}

Contributions
Rupert Hine - Immunity (1981, A&M) - "Misplaced Love"Tuff Turf - "Love Hates"Trouble in Mind (film) (1985)Lost in the Stars: The Music of Kurt Weill (1985, A&M) – "Ballad of the Soldier's Wife"
Michael Mantler - Many Have No Speech (1988, 13 tracks)The Wall – Live in Berlin (1990, Mercury) – Pink's Mother in "The Trial" with Roger Waters, Tim Curry, Thomas Dolby, Ute Lemper and Albert FinneyThe Bells of Dublin (1991, RCA Records) – "I Saw Three Ships" (with The Chieftains)
 Ismaël Lô – Jammu Africa (1995) – "Without Blame" (written by Roger Waters)The Long Black Veil (1995, RCA Records) – "Love is Teasin'" (with The Chieftains)The City of Lost Children (1995) (opening song "Who Will Take My Dreams Away")
Oxbow – Serenade In Red (1996) – "Over" & "Insylum"
 Metallica – ReLoad (1997) – "The Memory Remains"
 Emmaus Mouvement (1999, Virgin France) – Emmaus Mouvement 50th anniversary record – Shakespeare's "Sonnet 14"The L Word (2004, Tommy Boy) – "The Pleasure Song"
Joe Jackson - Night and Day II (2000, Sony Classical Records) - "Love Got Lost"Monsieur Gainsbourg Revisited (2005, Virgin/Verve Forecest) – "Lola R. For Ever" (with Sly and Robbie)The Magic Position (2007) – "Magpie" (with Patrick Wolf) (2011) – "Manon" (with }Chimes of Freedom: The Songs of Bob Dylan Honoring 50 Years of Amnesty International (2012, Fontana Distribution) - "Baby, Let Me Follow You Down (Live)"Son of Rogues Gallery: Pirate Ballads, Sea Songs & Chanteys (2013) – "Flandyke Shore" (with Kate & Anna McGarrigle)The Rarities Collection'' (2015)

Notes

References

Rock music discographies
Pop music discographies
Discographies of British artists